Parafabricia mazzellae is a species of annelid worm in the class Polychaeta, which particularly lives in slightly acidified coastal systems in the Mediterranean Sea.

References

External links
WORMS

Sabellida